Shivering Spooks is a 1926 short silent comedy film directed by Robert F. McGowan. It was the 52nd Our Gang short subject released. One of the child actors, Johnny Downs, went on to become a successful character actor and starred with George Zucco in The Mad Monster (1942).

Plot
A phony spiritualist named Professor Fleece dupes gullible people into believing he can contact the dead through seances. When the Our Gang kids disrupt one of his seances, the Professor orders his henchmen to scare the heck out of the kids so that they will leave the area.

Cast

The Gang
 Joe Cobb as Joe
 Jackie Condon as Jackie
 Johnny Downs as Johnny
 Allen Hoskins as Farina
 Mary Kornman as Mary
 Scooter Lowry as Skooter
 Jay R. Smith as Jay
 Bobby Young as Bonedust
 Buster the Dog as Buster

Additional cast
 Harry Bowen - Assistant to Professor Fleece
 George B. French - Professor Fleece
 Clara Guiol - 'Sucker' at séance
 Ham Kinsey - Assistant to Professor Fleece
 Tiny Sandford - Detective
 Dorothea Wolbert - 'Sucker' at séance

See also
 Our Gang filmography

References

External links

1926 films
1926 short films
American silent short films
American black-and-white films
Films directed by Robert F. McGowan
Hal Roach Studios short films
Our Gang films
1926 comedy films
1920s American films
Silent American comedy films
1920s English-language films